Elenchus is an insect genus in the family Elenchidae.

External links

Strepsiptera
Insect genera